This is a list of tourist attractions in the Philippines.

Amusement, national and natural parks, and monuments 
Color Key

Churches 
Color Key

Cultural and historical landmarks 
Color Key

Natural landmarks 
Color Key

Schools, colleges and universities 
Color Key

Urban architecture landmarks 
Color Key

See also 
 Tourism in the Philippines

Notes and references